Aegoschema cinereum is a species of beetle in the family Cerambycidae, also referred to as "lamiinaes" or flat-faced longhorn beetles. It was described by F. Lane in 1938.

References

Acanthoderini
Beetles described in 1938